Khewra is a village in the Sonipat district of Haryana, India. Khewra is an estate separately assessed for land-revenue as defined by The Punjab Land Revenue Act of 1967; as such, it has boundary contacts with several other revenue estates, specifically Paldi, Paladi, Palri Kalan and Jajal. Khewra shares the Postal Index Number 131021 with several other localities in Sonipat: Bahalgarh, Baroli, Deepalpur, Liwaspur, and Qumaspur.

This locality does not appear in The Imperial Gazetteer of India, published in the early 20th century; rather, the only "Khewra" reference is to Khewra, Punjab.

References 

Villages in Sonipat district